Hammaspeikko (Finnish for "tooth troll", from hammas "tooth" and peikko "troll") is a metaphorical device for explaining tooth decay (caries) to children. Eating candy lures tooth trolls, which drill holes into teeth and look scary. Brushing the teeth scares them away. It is not clear whether the tooth troll is a single entity, or if there are many.

The fictional character Hammaspeikko is an adaptation from the Norwegian book Karius og Baktus written by Thorbjørn Egner published in 1949. The book introduces two characters related to dental health, Karius (standing for caries) and Bactus (standing for bacteria). The book was translated in Finnish as Satu hammaspeikoista ("A Tale about Tooth Trolls") and published in 1961.

Similar spirits were believed to cause toothache in the old Finnish religion.

See also
Tooth fairy
Cavity Creeps

Finnish mythology
Fictional trolls
Dentistry